Sabine Ladurner (born 16 October 1960) is a former Italian female middle-distance runner and cross-country runner who competed at individual senior level at the World Athletics Cross Country Championships (1979, 80).

References

External links
 

1960 births
Living people
Italian female middle-distance runners
Italian female long-distance runners
Italian female cross country runners
Italian female marathon runners
Italian masters athletes
Sportspeople from Merano
20th-century Italian women
21st-century Italian women